Frederick Health Hospital is the only hospital in Frederick County, Maryland. It is located in the city of Frederick.

References

Buildings and structures in Frederick County, Maryland
Hospitals in Maryland